HSDL may refer to:

Dilling Airport
Homeland Security Digital Library